Missa cellensis (where "Zell" stands for Mariazell) refers to two masses by Joseph Haydn:
 Cäcilien-Messe (St. Cecilia Mass), Hob. XXII:5, written in 1766, and after the score was lost to a fire, recomposed from memory in 1773.
 Mariazeller-Messe (Mass for Mariazell), Hob. XXII:8, composed in 1782
Both masses are in C major, and both were written for the Mariazell pilgrimage church in Styria.

Cäcilien-Messe, Hob. XXII:5 (1766; 1773) 

The Missa cellensis, Hob. XXII:5, bearing the full title Missa cellensis in honorem Beatissimae Virginis Mariae (Zell Mass in honour of the most blessed virgin Mary), also known as Cäcilien-Messe, was composed for Mariazell. After the original 1766 score was lost in a fire, Haydn recomposed the work from memory in 1773, at which time he likely also expanded it.

Mariazeller-Messe, Hob. XXII:8 (1782)
The Missa cellensis, Hob. XXII:8, fully Missa cellensis fatta per il Signor Liebe de Kreutzner (Zell Mass made for Sir Liebe of Kreutzner), is Haydn's eighth setting of the Ordinary of the Mass and is often identified by the German name Mariazeller-Messe. It was commissioned by the officer Anton Liebe von Kreutzner on the occasion of his ennoblement. The mass was composed in 1782 for performance in Mariazell.

Structure
Compared to Haydn's late masses, the structure of Hob. XXII:8 is rather traditional: fugues at the ends of the Gloria, Credo and Agnus Dei, solo passages in the Gloria and Credo, and a soloistic Benedictus. On the other hand, Haydn included many innovations, such as the slow symphonic introduction at the beginning of the Kyrie, where the setting is built on the low voices of the choir and orchestra. The fugues are very rhythmic and syncopated, the solo passages appear very theatrical. This Mass may therefore be considered a link between Haydn's early and late masses.

Scoring:
 Soloists (SATB)
 Choir (SATB)
 2 oboes, bassoons, 2 trumpets, timpani, violins I and II, viola, cello, double bass, organ

Sections:

A typical performance lasts ca. 45 minutes.

References

Sources 
 Susanne Kraft-Blachny: Missa Cellensis [C-Dur] Fatta per il Signor Liebe de Kreutzner, »Mariazeller Messe« Komponiert für Herrn Liebe de Kreutzner Hob. XXII:8. In: Silke Leopold, Ullrich Scheideler: Oratorienführer. Metzler, Stuttgart 2000, S. 319 f.

External links
 

Masses by Joseph Haydn
1796 compositions
Compositions in C major